Rathnayaka Mudiyanselage Padma Udhaya Shantha Gunasekera (R.M. Padma Udayashantha Gunasekara) is a Sri Lankan politician and a former member of the Parliament of Sri Lanka. Member of the Sri Lankan Parliament for Monaragala District . Member of the 15th parliament of Sri Lanka. He was the son of Dharmadasa Banda.

References

Year of birth missing (living people)
Living people
Sri Lankan Buddhists
Members of the 13th Parliament of Sri Lanka
Janatha Vimukthi Peramuna politicians
Jathika Nidahas Peramuna politicians
United People's Freedom Alliance politicians
Sinhalese politicians